The 1964 Long Beach State 49ers football team represented California State College, Long Beach—now known as California State University, Long Beach—as a member of the California Collegiate Athletic Association (CCAA) during the 1964 NCAA College Division football season. Led by seventh-year head coach Don Reed, the 49ers compiled an overall record of 8–2 with a mark of 3–2 in conference play, placing third in the CCAA. Long Beach State's two losses each came against teams then ranked No. 2 in the AP small college poll, San Diego State on October 10 and Cal State Los Angeles on November 14. The team played home games at Veterans Memorial Stadium adjacent to the campus of Long Beach City College in Long Beach, California.

Schedule

Team players in the NFL/AFL
The following were selected in the 1965 NFL Draft.

The following finished their college career in 1964, were not drafted, but played in the AFL (prior to the merger with the NFL).

Notes

References

Long Beach State
Long Beach State 49ers football seasons
Long Beach State 49ers football